Gorodishche may refer to:
Gorodishche Urban Settlement, a municipal formation which the town of district significance of Gorodishche in Gorodishchensky District of Penza Oblast, Russia is incorporated as
Gorodishche, Russia, several inhabited localities in Russia
Horodiște (Gorodishche), several inhabited localities in Moldova
Horodyshche (Gorodishche), a town in Cherkasy Oblast, Ukraine

See also
Sarskoye Gorodishche, early medieval settlement near Rostov in Yaroslavl Oblast, Russia
Gorodishchensky (disambiguation)